The Gupis-Yasin District is the westernmost district of the 14 districts of Pakistan-administered territory of Gilgit-Baltistan. The Gupis-Yasin District was created in 2019 from the Gupis Tehsil and the Yasin Tehsil, which were the two western tehsils of the former, larger Ghizer District.

Geography

The Gupis-Yasin District is bounded on the north and west by the Upper Chitral District of Pakistan's Khyber Pakhtunkhwa Province, on the east by the Ghizer District, on the south by the Swat District of Pakistan's Khyber Pakhtunkhwa Province and the Upper Kohistan District of Pakistan's Khyber Pakhtunkhwa Province. The map of the former Ghizer District shows the Yasin Tehsil and the former, larger Gupis Tehsil, which was subsequently divided into two tehsils: the present, smaller Gupis Tehsil and the Phander Tehsil.  The present Ghizer District consists of the Ishkoman Tehsil and the Punial Tehsil.

Administration
The Gupis-Yasin District consists of three tehsils:

 Gupis Tehsil
 Phander Tehsil
 Yasin Tehsil

The district headquarters is the town of Phander.

Notes

References

 
Districts of Gilgit-Baltistan
2019 establishments in Pakistan
States and territories established in 2019